Sveva Gerevini (born 31 May 1996) is an Italian heptathlete, who won five national championships at individual senior level from 2017 to 2020.

Biography
In 2019 at the national championships of Brixen she establishes her personal best with 5907 pts, 8th best Italian performance all-time and best result of an Italian female athlete in the last eight years.

Achievements

National titles
She has won seven national titles at individual senior level.
Italian Athletics Championships
Heptathlon: 2017, 2018, 2019, 2000 (4)
Italian Athletics Indoor Championships
Pentathlon: 2019, 2020, 2022 (3)

See also
 Italian all-time lists - Heptathlon

References

External links
 
  

1996 births
Living people
Italian female high jumpers
Italian female long jumpers
Italian heptathletes
Italian Athletics Championships winners
Athletics competitors of Centro Sportivo Carabinieri
21st-century Italian women